Lissocampus fatiloquus, also known as prophet's pipefish is a species of marine fish belonging to the family Syngnathidae. The species has been noted in a variety of habitats including sargassum, seagrass beds and sandy substrates along the coast of Western Australia from Shark Bay to Rottnest Island. Their diet is thought to consist of small crustaceans such as copepods. Reproduction occurs through ovoviviparity in which the males brood eggs before giving live birth.

References

External links 
 Lissocampus fatiloquus at Fishbase
 Lissocampus fatiloquus at Fishes of Australia

Syngnathidae
Fish described in 1943